Jack Mills was an American set decorator. He was nominated for an Academy Award in the category Best Art Direction for the film How the West Was Won.

Selected filmography
 How the West Was Won (1962)

References

External links

American set decorators
American art directors
Year of birth missing
Year of death missing
Place of birth missing
Place of death missing